Tenakee Seaplane Base  is a state-owned public-use seaplane base located in Tenakee Springs, a city on Chichagof Island in the Hoonah-Angoon Census Area of the U.S. state of Alaska. Scheduled airline service is subsidized by the Essential Air Service program.

The National Plan of Integrated Airport Systems for 2015-2019 categorized it as a general aviation airport based on 657 enplanements (passenger boardings) in 2012 (the commercial service category requires at least 2,500 enplanements per year). As per the Federal Aviation Administration, this airport had 639 enplanements in calendar year 2008, 617 enplanements in 2009, and 645 in 2010.

Facilities and aircraft 
Tenakee Seaplane Base has a seaplane landing area designated E/W which measures 10,000 by 7,000 feet (3,048 x 2,134 m). It also has a helipad designated H1 with a wood surface measuring 76 by 66 feet (23 x 20 m).

For the 12-month period ending December 31, 2006, it had 650 aircraft operations, an average of 54 per month: 77% air taxi and 23% general aviation.

Airlines and destinations
The following airline offers scheduled passenger service:

Statistics

See also 
 Angoon Seaplane Base

References

Other sources 

 Essential Air Service documents (Docket DOT-OST-2006-25542) from the U.S. Department of Transportation:
 90-Day Notice (August 1, 2006): of Alaska Juneau Aeronautics, Inc. d/b/a Wings of Alaska of intent to terminate Essential Air Service at Angoon and Tenakee, Alaska.
 Order 2006-9-17 (September 19, 2006): allowing Alaska Juneau Aeronautics, Inc., d/b/a Wings of Alaska, to suspend its unsubsidized scheduled service at Angoon and Tenakee, Alaska, on September 23, 2006.
 90-Day Notice (October 6, 2008): of Alaska Seaplane Service, LLC to terminate all scheduled service at Angoon and Tenakee, Alaska.
 Order 2008-12-27 (December 29, 2008): selecting Alaska Seaplane Service, LLC, to provide essential air service (EAS) at annual subsidy rate of $101,359 at Angoon and $63,748 at Tenakee, Alaska, through January 31, 2011.
 Order 2010-12-7 (December 3, 2010): reselected Alaska Seaplane Service, LLC, to provide essential air service (EAS) at Angoon and Tenakee, Alaska, at annual subsidy rates of $145,734 at Angoon and $135,576 at Tenakee, from February 1, 2011, through January 31, 2015.
 Order 2011-3-18 (March 15, 2011): amends the payout formula for Angoon and Tenakee.

External links 

 Topographic map from USGS The National Map

Airports in the Hoonah–Angoon Census Area, Alaska
Essential Air Service
Seaplane bases in Alaska